Piknik Country is an international country music festival, held annually since 1983 in Mrągowo, Poland, on the last weekend of July. There are performances by both Polish and foreign artists. 

In 1989, it was the largest country festival in Eastern Europe.

Piknik Country is the oldest country music festival in Eastern Europe.

See also 
List of country music festivals
List of folk festivals

References

External links

 Official website
 http://www.polcountry.medianet.pl/piknik/
Folk festivals in Poland
Music festivals in Poland
Music festivals established in 1983
Country music festivals in Poland
Summer events in Poland